Heidi is a 2005 British family film directed by Paul Marcus. It is based on the iconic 1881 novel Heidi by Johanna Spyri, and stars Irish child actress Emma Bolger in the title role, alongside Max Von Sydow and Diana Rigg.

Plot
Heidi, a cheerful girl, is taken to live with her grandfather in the Swiss Alps. She becomes close friends with Peter, a goatherd, and spends much of her time with the boy and his goats outdoors.

Heidi is sent to the wealthy Sesemann family in Frankfurt, to be the hired companion of Clara Sesemann, an invalid. The strict housekeeper, Fräulein Rottenmeier, views the household disruptions Heidi causes as her misbehavior and places Heidi under increasing restrictions. Heidi grows homesick and pale. Her one diversion is learning to read and write, motivated by the thought of going home and reading to Peter's blind grandmother. Clara's grandmother visits and becomes a friend to Heidi.

After Heidi becomes seriously ill, the adults allow her to return to her grandfather. Heidi and Clara stay in touch and exchange letters. Clara's doctor, believing the fresh mountain air and wholesome companionship will do her good, recommends that Clara visit Heidi. Clara visits again the following season and spends a wonderful summer with Heidi, growing stronger on goat milk and fresh air. Peter, jealous of Heidi and Clara's friendship, pushes Clara's empty wheelchair down the mountain. The wheelchair is destroyed. While retrieving the wheelchair for Clara, Heidi nearly falls into a ravine. Clara rushes to save her and finds herself able to walk. Her grandmother and father are overcome with joy, and the doctor promises to take care of Heidi when her grandfather's no longer able to do so.

Cast
 Emma Bolger as Heidi
 Max Von Sydow as Grandfather
 Geraldine Chaplin as Rottenmeier
 Diana Rigg as Grandmamma
 Pauline McLynn as Aunt Dete
 Sam Friend as Peter
 Jessica Claridge as Clara
 Del Synnott as Sebastian
 Kellie Shirley as Tinette
 Robert Bathurst as Mr. Sessemann
 Oliver Ford Davies as Dr. Classen
 Caroline Pegg as Bridget
 Jessica James as Grannie 
 Alexander Main as Frankfurt Boy
 Karl Johnson as Old Man

Production
The soundtrack is composed by Jocelyn Pook. The mountain scenes were shot mostly in Julian Alps in Slovenia, scenes of Frankfurt in Ljubljana and village scenes in Neath, and Llanelli, Wales. The Sesemann house in Frankfurt was shot at Stradey Castle in Llanelli.

References

External links
 
 Heidi at Rotten Tomatoes

2005 films
2005 drama films
Heidi films
Films directed by Paul Marcus
Films scored by Jocelyn Pook
British drama films
2000s English-language films
2000s British films